MacRobert or McRobert is a surname. Notable people with the name include:

 MacRobert baronets, a title in the Baronetage of the United Kingdom
 Sir Alexander MacRobert, 1st Baronet, Scottish self-made millionaire
 Rachel Workman MacRobert, Lady MacRobert (1884–1954), Scottish geologist and philanthropist
 Alan MacRobert (born 1951), astronomy writer, after whom asteroid 10373 MacRobert is named
 Alexander MacRobert (politician) (1873–1930), Scottish lawyer and Unionist politician
 Alexander McRobert (Virginia politician), a mayor of Richmond, Virginia in 1789
 Angus MacRobert (born 1968), South African cricketer
 Karin McRobert (born 1953), Australian basketball player
 Leslie McRobert, a World War I flying ace
 Stuart McRobert (born 1958), writer on strength training
 Thomas Murray MacRobert (1884-1962), Scottish mathematician

See also

McRoberts (disambiguation)